Véménd ( or ) is a village in Baranya County, Hungary. Until the end of World War II, the inhabitants were Danube Swabians. Most of the former German settlers were expelled to Germany and Austria in 1945–1948, in accordance with the Potsdam Agreement.
Only a few Germans live in the village today, while the majority of the population are descentants of Hungarians from the Czechoslovak–Hungarian population exchange.

References

Populated places in Baranya County
Serb communities in Hungary